Lee Jung-Ja (born 28 March 1951) is a South Korean former volleyball player who competed in the 1972 Summer Olympics.

References

1951 births
Living people
South Korean women's volleyball players
Olympic volleyball players of South Korea
Volleyball players at the 1972 Summer Olympics